The Battle of Beshtamak was a military conflict between the Crimean Khanate and the Kabardian Principality.

History 
In 1774, during the ongoing Russo-Circassian War, a Crimean army of many thousands invaded Kabarda and laid siege to Mozdok. In the Beshtamak area and on the Gundelen River Kabardian cavalry  defeated the enemy. The remnants retreated from Kabarda.

References 

18th-century conflicts
18th century in the Crimean Khanate
Wars involving the Circassians
Battles involving the Crimean Khanate